Najgori do sada (The Worst Yet) is the third album from Serbian hip-hop band Bad Copy. The album was released in December 2006. Videos were shot for two songs Bad Copy Žoor and Idemo Odma ft. Škabo both produced by Đolođolo.

Track listing 
 Intro - Veliki smrad
 Bad copy žoor
 E to je on
 Helanke bele tange zelene (tu lebac mećem)
 Štroka
 Skit V.S. (kućni red)
 Kućni red
 Plaža
 Ne znam da đuzgam
 Sise
 Kaubojci (skit)
 Refren jeben
 Dušmanka
 Skit V.S. (Vinjak)
 Vinjau
 Jebi se u glavu
 Pimp style
 Pečen kesten
 Idemo odma
 Skit V.S.
 Outro - Drugarice
 Bonus Traka(Jedna Buksna)

References
discogs
Last FM

2006 albums
Bad Copy albums